Adenochilus nortonii, commonly known as the white gnome orchid or Australian gnome orchid, is a plant in the orchid family Orchidaceae and is endemic to a few isolated locations in New South Wales. It has a long, thin underground rhizome, a single leaf and a single white flower with reddish glandular hairs on the outside. Its labellum has red bars and a central band of yellow calli.

Description
The outer surface of the sepals and petals is covered with reddish glandular hairs. The middle lobe is narrow with a dense central band of yellow calli and the side lobes are broader. Flowering occurs in November and December.

Taxonomy and naming
Adenochilus nortonii was first formally described in 1876 by Robert FitzGerald from a specimen collected near Mount Victoria and the description was published in his book Australian Orchids. The specific epithet (nortonii) honours James Norton (1824-1906), an amateur botanist and friend of Fitzgerald.

Distribution and habitat
The white gnome orchid grows in rock crevices, in sphagnum and near creeks in beech forest, usually above . It is found in the Blue Mountains, Barrington Tops and Point Lookout areas.

References

nortonii
Plants described in 1876
Orchids of New South Wales
Taxa named by Robert D. FitzGerald